Satanfah Rachanon (born January 19, 1996), also known as Satanfah Sitsongpeenong, is a Thai Muay Thai fighter. Satanfah is a former WBC Muay Thai 154lbs World Champion.

Titles and accomplishments
 WBC Muay Thai 
 2019 WBC Muay Thai World Super Welterweight / 154lbs Champion

 THAI FIGHT 
 2018 THAI FIGHT 70kg Champion
 2018 Isuzu Cup Super Fight 67kg Champion 

 Omnoi Stadium 
 2018 Isuzu Cup Tournament Winner

Fight record

|-  style="background:#cfc;"
| 2023-03-04|| Win||align=left| Ashkan VenumMuayThai  || Rajadamnern World Series || Bangkok, Thailand || TKO (punches)|| 3 ||2:12
|- style="background:#fbb"
| 2023-01-28|| Loss ||align=left| Chhoeun Lvie  || IPCC Kun Khmer || Battambong, Cambodia || TKO || 3 || 1:25
|- style="background:#cfc"
| 2022-12-23|| Win ||align=left| Furkan WMC Lamai Muay Thai || Rajadamnern World Series || Bangkok, Thailand || Decision || 5 || 3:00
|- style="background:#fbb" 
| 2022-11-18 || Loss ||align="left" | Daniel SinbiMuaythai || Rajadamnern World Series - Semi Final|| Bangkok, Thailand || TKO (Punches) || 1 || 2:45
|- style="background:#cfc" 
| 2022-10-14 ||Win ||align="left" | Petch-U-Bon Sitchefboontham|| Rajadamnern World Series - Group Stage|| Bangkok, Thailand || Decision (Unanimous) ||3  ||3:00
|- style="background:#cfc" 
| 2022-09-09 || Win ||align="left" | Reza Ahmadnezhad || Rajadamnern World Series - Group Stage  || Bangkok, Thailand || Decision (Unanimous) ||3  ||3:00 
|-  style="background:#fbb;"
| 2022-08-05|| Loss||align=left| Cajaiba PhuketFightClub || Rajadamnern World Series - Group Stage || Bangkok, Thailand ||  Decision (Majority)|| 3 ||3:00 
|-  style="background:#c5d2ea;"
| 2022-06-25|| Draw ||align=left| Thoeun Theara || IPCC Kun Khmer || Svay Rieng, Cambodia || Decision || 3 || 3:00 
|-  style="background:#CCFFCC;"
| 2022-03-19|| Win ||align=left| Thibault Kinsonnier || Muay Hardcore || Phuket, Thailand || TKO (Doctor Stoppage) || 2 || 
|-  style="background:#CCFFCC;"
| 2022-01-22|| Win ||align=left| Reza Ahmadnezhad || Muay Hardcore || Phuket, Thailand || Decision || 3 || 3:00
|-  style="background:#CCFFCC;"
| 2021-03-27|| Win ||align=left| Luis Cajaiba || WSS Fights, World Siam Stadium || Bangkok, Thailand || KO (Right Elbow) || 4 ||
|-  style="background:#CCFFCC;"
| 2020-11-02|| Win ||align=left| Khunsuk Sitchefboontham  || Chef Boontham, Rangsit Stadium || Rangsit, Thailand || Decision || 5 || 3:00
|- style="background:#FBB;"
| 2020-02-23 ||Loss||align=left| Yodwicha Por Boonsit || Authentic Mix Martial Arts || Phuket, Thailand ||KO (Elbow) || 2 || 
|-
! style=background:white colspan=9 |
|-  style="background:#CCFFCC;"
| 2019-09-09|| Win ||align=left| Chadd Collins ||  Lumpinee Stadium || Bangkok, Thailand || Decision || 5 || 3:00
|-
! style=background:white colspan=9 |
|-  style="background:#CCFFCC;"
| 2018-12-22|| Win ||align=left| Bobirjon Tagaev || THAI FIGHT Nakhon Ratchasima || Nakhon Ratchasima, Thailand || Decision || 3 || 3:00  
|-
! style=background:white colspan=9 |
|-  style="background:#CCFFCC;"
| 2018-11-24|| Win ||align=left| Wang Tengyue || THAI FIGHT Saraburi || Saraburi, Thailand || Decision || 3 || 3:00
|-  style="background:#CCFFCC;"
| 2018-10-27|| Win ||align=left| Brahim Machkour || THAI FIGHT Chiangrai 2018 || Chiang Rai, Thailand || KO (Left Knee to the Body) || 1 ||
|-  style="background:#CCFFCC;"
| 2018-08-25|| Win ||align=left| Luis Cajaiba || THAI FIGHT Rayong || Rayong, Thailand || Decision || 3 || 3:00
|-  style="background:#CCFFCC;"
| 2018-07-07|| Win ||align=left| Oleksandr Moisa || THAI FIGHT Hat Yai || Hat Yai, Thailand || Ext R. Decision || 4 || 3:00
|-  style="background:#CCFFCC;"
| 2018-05-12|| Win ||align=left| Pakorn PKSaenchaimuaythaigym  || THAI FIGHT Samui 2018 || Ko Samui, Thailand || Decision || 3 || 3:00
|-  style="background:#CCFFCC;"
| 2018-03-17 || Win ||align=left| Chalamphet Tor.Laksong  || Siam Omnoi Boxing Satdium - Isuzu Cup Final  || Thailand || Decision || 5 || 3:00
|-
! style=background:white colspan=9 |
|-  style="background:#CCFFCC;"
| 2018-01-20 || Win ||align=left| Faipa Sor.Narongrit  || Siam Omnoi Boxing Stadium - Isuzu Cup Semi Final||  Samut Sakhon, Thailand || Decision || 5 || 3:00
|-  style="background:#CCFFCC;"
| 2017-11-18 || Win ||align=left| Chaidet M-16 || Siam Omnoi Boxing Stadium - Isuzu Cup ||  Samut Sakhon, Thailand || Decision || 5 || 3:00
|-  style="background:#FFBBBB;"
| 2017-09-23 || Loss ||align=left| Phonek Or.Kwanmuang ||Siam Omnoi Boxing Stadium - Isuzu Cup ||  Samut Sakhon, Thailand || Decision || 5 || 3:00
|-  style="background:#CCFFCC;"
| 2017-08-26 || Win ||align=left| Payaluang Flukebamikiew || Siam Omnoi Boxing Stadium ||  Samut Sakhon, Thailand || Decision || 5 || 3:00
|-  style="background:#CCFFCC;"
| 2017-06-11 || Win ||align=left| Simanut Sor.Sarinya || Rangsit Boxing Stadium ||  Thailand || Decision || 5 || 3:00
|-  style="background:#CCFFCC;"
| 2017-05-14 || Win ||align=left| Khunsuek Aikbangsai || Blue Arena || Samut Prakan, Thailand || KO (Elbows) || 3 ||
|-  style="background:#FFBBBB;"
| 2017-03-30 || Loss ||align=left| Noppakrit Kor.Kampanat || Rangsit Boxing Stadium ||  Thailand || Decision || 5 || 3:00
|-  style="background:#FFBBBB;"
| 2017-02-17 || Loss ||align=left| Singsuriya Mor.Rattanabandit || Rangsit Boxing Stadium || Rangsit, Thailand || Decision || 5 || 3:00
|-  style="background:#CCFFCC;"
| 2016-12-20 || Win ||align=left| Rungnapa Pinsinchai || Rajadamnern Stadium || Bangkok, Thailand || KO || 2 ||
|-  style="background:#CCFFCC;"
| 2016-12-16 || Win ||align=left| Senphet Sangmorakot ||  || Thailand || KO || 3 ||
|-  style="background:#FFBBBB;"
| 2016-09-04 || Loss ||align=left| Nontakit Tor. Morsee || Channel 7 Boxing Stadium || Bangkok, Thailand || Decision || 5 || 3:00
|-  style="background:#CCFFCC;"
| 2016-08-05 || Win ||align=left| Rafi Bohic || Kiatpetch Show || Thailand || Decision || 5 || 3:00
|- style="background:#FFBBBB;"
| 2016-07-03 || Loss ||align=left| Chujaroen Dabransarakarm || Rajadamnern Stadium || Bangkok, Thailand || Decision || 5 || 3:00
|-  style="background:#FFBBBB;"
| 2016-03-20 || Loss ||align=left| Nontakit Tor. Morsee || Channel 7 Boxing Stadium|| Bangkok, Thailand || KO || 4 ||
|- style="background:#CCFFCC;"
| 2016-02-12 || Win ||align=left| Chujaroen Dabransarakarm || Lumpinee Stadium || Bangkok, Thailand || Decision || 5 || 3:00
|-  style="background:#CCFFCC;"
| 2016-01-16 || Win ||align=left| Padsenlek Rachanon  || Lumpinee Stadium || Bangkok, Thailand || Decision || 5 || 3:00
|-  style="background:#FFBBBB;"
| 2015-11-21 || Loss ||align=left| Manasak Sor. Jor.Lekmuangnon ||  || Uthai Thani, Thailand || Decision || 5 || 3:00
|-  style="background:#FFBBBB;"
| 2015-10-13 || Loss ||align=left| Chamuaktong Fightermuaythai || Lumpinee Stadium || Bangkok, Thailand || Decision || 5 || 3:00
|-  style="background:#CCFFCC;"
| 2015-08-28 || Win ||align=left| Rambo Phet Por.Tor.Aor  || Lumpinee Stadium || Bangkok, Thailand || Decision || 5 || 3:00
|-  style="background:#CCFFCC;"
| 2015-07-21 || Win ||align=left| Faipa Sor.Narongrit  || Lumpinee Stadium || Bangkok, Thailand || Decision || 5 || 3:00
|-  style="background:#CCFFCC;"
| 2015-06-28 || Win ||align=left| Newwangjan Pakornpornsurin  || Channel 7 Boxing Stadium || Bangkok, Thailand || Decision || 5 || 3:00
|-  style="background:#CCFFCC;"
| 2015-05-20 || Win ||align=left| Chaopatcharapol || Rajadamnern Stadium || Bangkok, Thailand || Decision || 5 || 3:00
|-  style="background:#CCFFCC;"
| 2015-04-12 || Win ||align=left| Abbass Luksuan || Channel 7 Boxing Stadium || Bangkok, Thailand || Decision || 5 || 3:00
|-  style="background:#FFBBBB;"
| 2015-02-22 || Loss ||align=left| Phetnamek P.K.SaenchaiMuaythaiGym || Rajadamnern Stadium || Bangkok, Thailand || Decision || 5 || 3:00
|-  style="background:#CCFFCC;"
| 2014-12-10 || Win ||align=left| Phichitchai Ror.Kilacorat || Lumpinee Stadium || Bangkok, Thailand || Decision || 5 || 3:00
|-
| colspan=9 | Legend:

References

1996 births
Satanfah Rachanon
Welterweight kickboxers
Satanfah Rachanon 
Living people